Shin Min-jun (born 11 January 1999) is a South Korean professional Go player.

Biography
Shin Min-jun was born in 1999. His father Shin Chang-seok is a television producer-director (PD) of popular KBS dramas.

Shin became a professional player in July 2012. He qualified as a pro in the same tournament as Shin Jinseo; the "two Shins" have often been compared. He studied Go under Lee Sedol, staying at Lee Sedol's house from March to July 2013.

He won six consecutive games for Korea in the 19th Nongshim Cup (2017–2018). He was finally eliminated in the seventh game by China's Dang Yifei, who went on to win five consecutive games, before  Kim Ji-seok won the final two games to clinch the victory for Korea.

In 2018, he took second place in the Globis Cup, an international U-20 tournament in Japan. He finished in the top four in the 23rd  LG Cup, after losing in the semifinal to Yang Dingxin. He won the Globis Cup in 2019.

In 2021, he won his first international championship at the 25th LG Cup, with a 2–1 victory in the final over eight-time world champion Ke Jie.

References

External links 
 Sensei's library profile
 Shin Min-jun on Go4Go
 Shin Min-jun on Go Ratings
 Korea Baduk Association profile (in Korean)

1999 births
Living people
South Korean Go players
Sportspeople from Seoul